Shah Neshin Gorj castle is a historical castle located in Amlash County in Gilan Province, The longevity of this fortress dates back to the Historical periods after Islam.

References 

Castles in Iran